UK Radio (alternate  name is UKWA) is a local radio station broadcasting on FM from Two Rocks to Currambine areas of Perth, Western Australia.  It is primarily aimed at the UK expat community living in this area.

History
UKWA the radio station was launched in July 2014 with the FM stations of 88FM in Yanchep and 87.8FM in Burns Beach/Kinross areas.

In July 2015, 87.8FM in Burns Beach/Kinross areas was expanded to Mindarie, Jindalee, Clarkson, Ridgewood, Quinns Rocks, Merriwa, Tamala Park, Butler and parts of Alkimos.

After the end of UKWA Yanchep's 88FM, it was replaced by Vision Christian Radio as at January 2016.

On 23 March 2018, the station started broadcasting on 87.6 FM to Butler, Jindalee, Alkimos and Eglinton.

In September 2018, Yanchep/Two Rocks was expanded on 87.6FM.

In December 2018, UKWA Radio rebranded UK Radio.

As of July 2021, UK Radio is currently on 87.6 FM in Yanchep, Two Rocks, Alkimos, Eglinton, Jindalee, and Butler and 87.8FM in Burns Beach, Kinross, Currambine, Iluka, Mindarie, Clarkson, Ridgewood, Quinns Rocks, Merriwa, Tamala Park and parts of Butler.

References

Radio stations in Perth, Western Australia
Radio stations established in 2014